Angres is a commune in the Pas-de-Calais department in the Hauts-de-France region of France.

Geography
The A26 autoroute passes by, just within the borders of the commune.

Population

Sights
 The church of St. Cyr, rebuilt, as was most of the village, after the First World War.
 The war memorials.

International relations
Angres is twinned with:
 Danderhall, Midlothian, Scotland.

See also
Communes of the Pas-de-Calais department

References

External links

 Town council website (in French)
 Website of the Communaupole de Lens-Liévin 

Communes of Pas-de-Calais
Artois